Leonard Koch (born 23 May 1995) is a German footballer who plays as a midfielder for SV Lichtenberg 47.

Career

Early career
Koch was at Empor Berlin until 30 June 2007 before joining Hertha BSC from 1 July 2007 to 30 June 2009.

Union Berlin
Koch joined Union Berlin in 2009 and joined the reserve team in 2013 when he made an appearance during the 2013–14 season. He joined the first team squad in 2013. However, he did not make any appearances for the first team until the 2014–15 season when he came on as an 88th-minute substitute for Sebastian Polter in a 2–0 win against Eintracht Braunschweig. He finished the 2014–15 season making only the one appearance in the 2. Bundesliga and a goal in 20 appearances in the Regionalliga Nordost.

SV Babelsberg 03
He then moved to Regionalliga Nordost club SV Babelsberg 03. He made his debut for the club when he came on as a substitute on matchday one against Wacker Nordhausen. He finished the 2016–17 season with two goals in 23 matches played. Koch dislocated his shoulder in a mid-season friendly match during the 2017–18 season. He was declared out for the remainder of the season. He had played in 14 matches up until the injury.

Career statistics

References

Living people
1995 births
Association football midfielders
German footballers
2. Bundesliga players
Regionalliga players
1. FC Union Berlin players
SV Babelsberg 03 players
SV Lichtenberg 47 players
Footballers from Berlin